"Potential New Boyfriend" is a song written by Steve Kipner and John Lewis Parker, and recorded by American entertainer Dolly Parton. The song peaked at number 20 on the U.S. country singles chart.  It was released in April 1983 as the only single to be released from Parton's album Burlap & Satin. The song was also popular in discos and dance clubs, and in addition to the standard 45 RPM single, an extended-play dance remix single was released. The single was also accompanied by one of Parton's first music videos, which was directed by Steve Barron.

The record is notable in being Parton's first song to be more successful on a chart other than country music, peaking at number 13 on Billboards Dance Chart. The song was covered by American actor and drag performer, Willam Belli. The song is featured on his debut album and released as the ninth single via iTunes on July 26, 2013.

Chart performance

References

External links
Potential New Boyfriend lyrics at Dolly Parton On-Line

1983 singles
1983 songs
Dolly Parton songs
RCA Records Nashville singles
Music videos directed by Steve Barron
Songs written by Steve Kipner